Tapur Chatterji (born 24 April 1979) is an Indian model.

Tapur along with twin sister Tupur are the granddaughters of veteran filmmaker Hrishikesh Mukherjee.

Tapur Chatterji has appeared in advertisements for Titan Raga watches, Lakme, and Park Avenue, amongst others, with a cover for Femina and numerous fashion features in magazines including Elle and Cosmopolitan.

Tapur has now forayed into interior designing as a career and has worked with celebrities like Kareena Kapoor and Saif Ali Khan.

TV shows
Fear Factor - Khatron Ke Khiladi on Colors TV

Jhalak Dikhhla Jaa 2 on Sony TV

References

Female models from Kolkata
1978 births
Living people
Fear Factor: Khatron Ke Khiladi participants